Erica Rhodes (born April 5, 1983) is an American actress and comedian. She has been performing on A Prairie Home Companion since the age of 10 and appeared in several movies and TV shows, including Plague Town, 1,000 Ways to Die, and The Consultants. She has also guest starred on New Girl, @midnight with Chris Hardwick, and Modern Family. She competed in the reality television comedy competition series Bring the Funny.

Early life
Rhodes is a native of Newton, Massachusetts. She attended Boston University College of Fine Arts and graduated from the Atlantic Theater Conservatory.

A Prairie Home Companion
Rhodes has been a frequent guest on A Prairie Home Companion since her first appearance in 1996 where she initiated her recurring role as "The Conscience" of the host, Garrison Keillor. She appears on Keillor's 1997 Grammy nominated album Garrison Keillor’s Comedy Theatre.

Podcast and radio appearances
Rhodes appeared on Ken Reid's TV Guidance Counselor podcast on September 28, 2016. She also made an appearance in Episode 74 of Maddox's podcast, "The Best Debate In The Universe," which aired on November 6, 2017.

Filmography

References

External links 
 Erica Rhodes Official Website
 
 Erica Rhodes Talent Page
 Erica Rhodes Biography
 Erica Rhodes Resume

Actresses from Massachusetts
Living people
American radio actresses
American film actresses
American television actresses
People from Newton, Massachusetts
American women comedians
Comedians from Massachusetts
20th-century American actresses
21st-century American actresses
Boston University College of Fine Arts alumni
People with bipolar disorder
20th-century American comedians
21st-century American comedians
Bring the Funny contestants
1983 births